The 1934 Maryland gubernatorial election was held on November 6, 1934. Republican nominee Harry Nice defeated Democratic incumbent Albert Ritchie with 49.52% of the vote.

Primary elections
Primary elections were held on September 8, 1934.

Republican primary

Candidates
Harry Nice, former Judge of the Appeals Tax Court of Baltimore City 
Phillips Lee Goldsborough, incumbent United States Senator
H. Webster Smith

Results

General election

Candidates
Major party candidates
Harry Nice, Republican 
Albert Ritchie, Democratic

Other candidates
Broadus Mitchell, Socialist
William A. Gillespe, Independent
Bernard Ades, Communist
Harry B. Galantian, Independent

Results

References

1934
Maryland
Gubernatorial